Jong Ajax (English: "Young Ajax"), also referred to as Ajax II or Ajax 2, is a Dutch association football team, the reserve team of Ajax. It is based in Amsterdam and competes in the Dutch Eerste Divisie.

History
Jong Ajax (formerly more commonly known as Ajax 2) is the reserve team of AFC Ajax. The team is composed mostly of professional footballers, who are often recent graduates from the highest youth level (Ajax A1), serving their first professional contract as a reserve, or players who are otherwise unable to play in the first team.

Since 1992 Jong Ajax have competed in the Beloften Eredivisie, competing against other reserve teams such as Jong PSV, Jong FC Groningen or Jong AZ. It has won the Beloften Eredivisie title a record eight times, as well as the KNVB Reserve Cup three times, making it the most successful reserve squad in the Netherlands. By winning the Beloften Eredivisie title, Jong Ajax were able to qualify for the actual KNVB Cup, even advancing to the semi-finals on three occasions. Its best result in the Dutch Cup was under manager Jan Olde Riekerink in 2001–02, when a semi-final loss to FC Utrecht in a Penalty shoot-out after extra time, which saw Utrecht advance, and thus preventing an Ajax vs. Jong Ajax Dutch Cup final.

The 2013–14 season marked the Jupiler League debut of the AFC Ajax reserves' squad Jong Ajax. Previously playing in the Beloften Eredivisie (a separate league for reserve teams, not included in the Dutch professional or amateur league structure) players were allowed to move around freely between the reserve team and the first team during the course of the season. This is no longer the case as Jong Ajax now registers and fields a separate squad from that of Ajax first team for the Eerste Divisie, the second tier of professional football in the Netherlands. Its home matches are played at Sportpark De Toekomst, except for the occasional match in the Amsterdam Arena. The only period in which players are able to move between squads is during the transfer windows, unless the player has made less than 15 appearances for the first team, then he is still eligible to appear in both first team and second team matches during the course of the season. Furthermore, the team is not eligible for promotion to the Eredivisie or to participate in the KNVB Cup. Jong Ajax was joined in the Eerste Divisie by Jong FC Twente and Jong PSV, reserve teams that have also moved from the Beloften Eredivisie to the Eerste Divisie, replacing VV Katwijk, SC Veendam and AGOVV Apeldoorn, and increasing the total number of teams in the league from 16 to 20.

Jong Ajax left the Beloften Eredivisie in 2013, having held a 21-year tenure in the reserves league, and having won the league title a record eight times (1994, 1996, 1998, 2001, 2002, 2004, 2005, 2009).

Players

Current squad
As of 2 February 2023

Out on loan

Staff
 Manager: John Heitinga
 Assistant manager: Michel Kreek
 Goalkeeper coach: René Stam
 Technical Coach: Gerald Vanenburg
 Team manager: Herman Arendse
 Physio: Tim Glazenburg
 Team physician: Maikel van Wijk

Former head coaches
  Aad de Mos
  Pieter Huistra
  Adrie Koster
  Michel Kreek
  Alfons Groenendijk
  Jan Olde Riekerink
  Sonny Silooy
  Marco van Basten
  Louis van Gaal
  John van 't Schip
  John van den Brom
  Gerard van der Lem
  Hans Westerhof
  Aron Winter
  Fred Grim
  Gery Vink
  Marcel Keizer
  Michael Reiziger
  Mitchell van der Gaag

Honours

Official trophies (recognized by UEFA and FIFA)

National
Eerste Divisie (1): 2017–18
Beloften Eredivisie (8): 1994, 1996, 1998, 2001, 2002, 2004, 2005, 2009
KNVB Reserve Cup (3): 2003, 2004, 2012
KNVB Amateur Cup (1): 1984
KNVB District Cup (4): 1984, 1987, 1993, 1994
KNVB Raven Cup (1) : 1956

International
HKFC International Soccer Sevens Main Tournament – Shield winners: 2010

Other trophies
 Den Helder Maritime Tournament (2): 1996, 2010

See also
 Ajax Youth Academy, Youth Academy of the club

References

External links
 Dutch information of Jong Ajax/Ajax B
 Dutch information of Jong Ajax
 Ajax F-Side – ASD / AFCA Supportersclub

Jong Ajax
AFC Ajax
Football clubs in the Netherlands
Association football clubs established in 1992
Football clubs in Amsterdam
Dutch reserve football teams
1992 establishments in the Netherlands